Wiadrów  is a village in the administrative district of Gmina Paszowice, within Jawor County, Lower Silesian Voivodeship, in south-western Poland. Prior to 1945 it was in Germany.

Gallerie

References

Villages in Jawor County